Aleksandr Shablenko (born 31 October 1957) is a retired decathlete who competed for the Soviet Union during his career. He set his personal best in the event (8294 points) on 1 June 1980 at a meet in Potsdam.

References
 trackfield.brinkster

1957 births
Living people
Soviet decathletes
Russian decathletes
Universiade medalists in athletics (track and field)
Universiade gold medalists for the Soviet Union
Medalists at the 1981 Summer Universiade